The 2020–21 New Orleans Pelicans season was the 19th season of the New Orleans Pelicans franchise in the National Basketball Association (NBA). On August 15, 2020, the New Orleans Pelicans fired head coach Alvin Gentry after five seasons with the team. On October 22, 2020, the Pelicans hired Stan Van Gundy as their new head coach, who was also fired on June 17, 2021, after just one season with the team. The Pelicans failed to qualify for the postseason for the third consecutive season following a loss to the Dallas Mavericks on May 12, 2021.

Following the season, the Pelicans and head coach Stan Van Gundy mutually agree to part ways.

Draft

After their March 11, 2020 game against the Sacramento Kings was postponed due to COVID-19 concerns with a referee, the Pelicans and Kings were stuck with a tied record for the best odds at the #12 pick of the 2020 NBA draft during the Suspension of the 2019–20 NBA season. However, as one of the teams invited to the 2020 NBA Bubble, it gave them a chance to move their selection up with a potential playoff spot earned there. Due to poor performances in the bubble, the Pelicans failed to gain any ground there. Even worse, despite gaining an extra loss, their first-round pick moved to #13 instead due to the Kings winning their tiebreaker via March 11 records. The Pelicans also held three second-round picks, with two of the three picks acquired via a three-way trade involving the Milwaukee Bucks and Detroit Pistons.

Roster

Standings

Division

Conference

Notes
 z – Clinched home court advantage for the entire playoffs
 c – Clinched home court advantage for the conference playoffs
 y – Clinched division title
 x – Clinched playoff spot
 pb – Clinched play-in spot
 o – Eliminated from playoff contention
 * – Division leader

Game log

Preseason

|-style="background:#cfc;"
| 1
| December 11
| @ Miami
| 
| Zion Williamson (26)
| Zion Williamson (11)
| Brandon Ingram (6)
| AmericanAirlines Arena0
| 1–0
|-style="background:#cfc;
| 2
| December 18
| vs Milwaukee
| 
| Zion Williamson (31)
| Adams, Williamson (9)
| Lonzo Ball (8)
| Smoothie King Center0
| 2–0

Regular season

|-style="background:#cfc;"
| 1
| December 23
| @ Toronto
| 
| Brandon Ingram (24)
| Zion Williamson (10)
| Brandon Ingram (11)
| Amalie Arena0
| 1–0
|-style="background:#fcc;"
| 2
| December 25
| @ Miami
| 
| Zion Williamson (32)
| Zion Williamson (14)
| Ball, Bledsoe (6)
| American Airlines ArenaLimited seating
| 1–1
|-style="background:#cfc;"
| 3
| December 27
| San Antonio
| 
| Brandon Ingram (28)
| Brandon Ingram (11)
| Brandon Ingram (6)
| Smoothie King CenterLimited seating
| 2–1
|-style="background:#fcc;"
| 4
| December 29
| @ Phoenix
| 
| Zion Williamson (20)
| Adams, Melli (8)
| Brandon Ingram (6)
| PHX Arena0
| 2–2
|-style="background:#cfc;"
| 5
| December 31
| @ Oklahoma City
| 
| Brandon Ingram (12)
| Steven Adams (10)
| Lonzo Ball (9)
| Chesapeake Energy Arena0
| 3–2

|-style="background:#cfc;"
| 6
| January 2
| Toronto
| 
| Brandon Ingram (31)
| Steven Adams (10)
| Eric Bledsoe (10)
| Smoothie King CenterLimited seating
| 4–2
|-style="background:#fcc;"
| 7
| January 4
| Indiana
| 
| Brandon Ingram (31)
| Eric Bledsoe (11)
| Brandon Ingram (8)
| Smoothie King CenterLimited seating
| 4–3
|-style="background:#fcc;"
| 8
| January 6
| Oklahoma City
| 
| Zion Williamson (29)
| Adams, Ingram (11)
| Steven Adams (10)
| Smoothie King CenterLimited seating
| 4–4
|-style="background:#fcc;"
| 9
| January 8
| Charlotte
| 
| Zion Williamson (26)
| Hart, Ingram, Williamson (8)
| Brandon Ingram (8)
| Smoothie King CenterLimited seating
| 4–5
|-style="background:#ccc;"
| –
| January 11
| @ Dallas
| colspan="6" | Postponed (COVID-19) (Makeup date: May 12)
|-style="background:#fcc;"
| 10
| January 13
| @ L. A. Clippers
| 
| Nickeil Alexander-Walker (37)
| Jaxson Hayes (10)
| Steven Adams (15)
| Staples Center0
| 4–6
|-style="background:#fcc;"
| 11
| January 15
| @ L. A. Lakers
| 
| Zion Williamson (21)
| Zion Williamson (12)
| Brandon Ingram (5)
| Staples Center0
| 4–7
|-style="background:#cfc;"
| 12
| January 17
| @ Sacramento
| 
| Zion Williamson (31)
| Steven Adams (15)
| Alexander-Walker, Lewis Jr. (5)
| Golden 1 Center0
| 5–7
|-style="background:#fcc;"
| 13
| January 19
| @ Utah
| 
| Zion Williamson (32)
| Zion Williamson (9)
| Ball, Ingram (4)
| Vivint Smart Home ArenaLimited seating
| 5–8
|-style="background:#fcc;"
| 14
| January 21
| @ Utah
| 
| Zion Williamson (27)
| Steven Adams (16)
| Lonzo Ball (5)
| Vivint Smart Home ArenaLimited seating
| 5–9
|-style="background:#fcc;"
| 15
| January 23
| @ Minnesota
| 
| Brandon Ingram (30)
| Zion Williamson (11)
| Lonzo Ball (7)
| Target Center0
| 5–10
|-style="background:#ccc;"
| –
| January 25
| San Antonio
| colspan="6" | Postponed (COVID-19) (Makeup date: April 24)
|-style="background:#cfc;"
| 16
| January 27
| Washington
| 
| Ingram, Williamson (32)
| Steven Adams (18)
| Brandon Ingram (8)
| Smoothie King CenterLimited seating
| 6–10
|-style="background:#cfc;"
| 17
| January 29
| Milwaukee
| 
| Brandon Ingram (28)
| Steven Adams (20)
| Lonzo Ball (8)
| Smoothie King CenterLimited seating
| 7–10
|-style="background:#fcc;"
| 18
| January 30
| Houston
| 
| Zion Williamson (26)
| Lonzo Ball (8)
| Eric Bledsoe (5)
| Smoothie King CenterLimited seating
| 7–11

|-style="background:#fcc;"
| 19
| February 1
| Sacramento
| 
| Brandon Ingram (20)
| Josh Hart (13)
| Lonzo Ball (5)
| Smoothie King Center1,440
| 7–12
|-style="background:#cfc;"
| 20
| February 3
| Phoenix
| 
| Zion Williamson (28)
| Steven Adams (13)
| Ingram, Williamson (6)
| Smoothie King Center1,440
| 8–12
|-style="background:#cfc;"
| 21
| February 5
| @ Indiana
| 
| Brandon Ingram (30)
| Steven Adams (12)
| Brandon Ingram (7)
| Bankers Life Fieldhouse0
| 9–12
|-style="background:#cfc;"
| 22
| February 6
| Memphis
| 
| Zion Williamson (29)
| Brandon Ingram (12)
| Lonzo Ball (7)
| Smoothie King Center1,440
| 10–12
|-style="background:#cfc;"
| 23
| February 9
| Houston
| 
| Brandon Ingram (22)
| Josh Hart (17)
| Zion Williamson (7)
| Smoothie King Center1,900
| 11–12
|-style="background:#fcc;"
| 24
| February 10
| @ Chicago
| 
| Zion Williamson (29)
| Adams, Hart (6)
| Lonzo Ball (7)
| United Center0
| 11–13
|-style="background:#fcc;"
| 25
| February 12
| @ Dallas
| 
| Zion Williamson (36)
| Willy Hernangómez (9)
| Lonzo Ball (7)
| American Airlines CenterLimited seating
| 11–14
|-style="background:#fcc;"
| 26
| February 14
| @ Detroit
| 
| Ingram, Williamson (26)
| Steven Adams (12)
| Brandon Ingram (7)
| Little Caesars Arena0
| 11–15
|-style="background:#cfc;"
| 27
| February 16
| @ Memphis
| 
| Zion Williamson (31)
| Josh Hart (9)
| Brandon Ingram (7)
| FedEx Forum1,982
| 12–15
|-style="background:#fcc;"
| 28
| February 17
| Portland
| 
| Zion Williamson (36)
| Willy Hernangómez (17)
| Brandon Ingram (6)
| Smoothie King Center1,940
| 12–16
|-style="background:#fcc;"
| 29
| February 19
| Phoenix
| 
| Brandon Ingram (25)
| Willy Hernangómez (13)
| Lonzo Ball (12)
| Smoothie King Center1,940
| 12–17
|-style="background:#cfc;"
| 30
| February 21
| Boston
| 
| Brandon Ingram (33)
| Willy Hernangómez (13)
| Ball, Williamson (4)
| Smoothie King Center1,940
| 13–17
|-style="background:#cfc"
| 31
| February 24
| Detroit
| 
| Zion Williamson (32)
| Steven Adams (15)
| Ball, Ingram (8)
| Smoothie King Center2,700
| 14–17
|-style="background:#fcc"
| 32
| February 25
| @ Milwaukee
| 
| Zion Williamson (34)
| Steven Adams (13)
| Lonzo Ball (8)
| Fiserv Forum1,800
| 14–18
|-style="background:#fcc;"
| 33
| February 27
| @ San Antonio
| 
| Brandon Ingram (29)
| Zion Williamson (14)
| Ingram, Williamson (5)
| AT&T Center0
| 14–19

|-style="background:#cfc;"
| 34
| March 1
| Utah
| 
| Ingram, Williamson (26)
| Steven Adams (11)
| Lonzo Ball (8)
| Smoothie King Center2,700
| 15–19
|-style="background:#fcc;"
| 35
| March 3
| Chicago
| 
| Zion Williamson (28)
| Zion Williamson (9)
| Eric Bledsoe (10)
| Smoothie King Center2,700
| 15–20
|-style="background:#fcc;"
| 36
| March 4
| Miami
| 
| Brandon Ingram (17)
| Josh Hart (8)
| Brandon Ingram (9)
| Smoothie King Center2,700
| 15–21
|-style="background:#fcc;"
| 37
| March 11
| Minnesota
| 
| Zion Williamson (24)
| Josh Hart (13)
| Lonzo Ball (7)
| Smoothie King Center3,700
| 15–22
|-style="background:#cfc;"
| 38
| March 12
| Cleveland
| 
| Brandon Ingram (28)
| Steven Adams (17)
| Lonzo Ball (6)
| Smoothie King Center3,700
| 16–22
|-style="background:#cfc;"
| 39
| March 14
| L. A. Clippers
| 
| Zion Williamson (27)
| Adams, Ball (8)
| Eric Bledsoe (8)
| Smoothie King Center3,700
| 17–22
|-style="background:#fcc;"
| 40
| March 16
| @ Portland
| 
| Brandon Ingram (30)
| Josh Hart (8)
| Lonzo Ball (17)
| Moda Center0
| 17–23
|-style="background:#fcc;"
| 41
| March 18
| @ Portland
| 
| Zion Williamson (26)
| Adams, Williamson (10)
| Lonzo Ball (8)
| Moda Center0
| 17–24
|-style="background:#cfc;"
| 42
| March 21
| @ Denver
| 
| Ingram, Williamson (30)
| Steven Adams (13)
| Brandon Ingram (8)
| Ball Arena0
| 18–24
|-style="background:#cfc;"
| 43
| March 23
| L. A. Lakers
| 
| Brandon Ingram (36)
| Josh Hart (15)
| Kira Lewis (6)
| Smoothie King Center3,700
| 19–24
|-style="background:#fcc;"
| 44
| March 26
| Denver
| 
| Zion Williamson (39)
| Zion Williamson (10)
| Eric Bledsoe (9)
| Smoothie King Center3,700
| 19–25
|-style="background:#cfc;"
| 45
| March 27
| @ Dallas
| 
| Zion Williamson (38)
| Josh Hart (10)
| Zion Williamson (6)
| Smoothie King Center3,700
| 20–25
|-style="background:#cfc;"
| 46
| March 29
| @ Boston
| 
| Zion Williamson (28)
| Josh Hart (15)
| Brandon Ingram (9)
| TD Garden2,298
| 21–25

|-style="background:#fcc;"
| 47
| April 1
| Orlando
| 
| Nickeil Alexander-Walker (31)
| Josh Hart (17)
| Eric Bledsoe (6)
| Smoothie King Center3,700
| 21–26
|-style="background:#fcc;"
| 48
| April 2
| Atlanta
| 
| Kira Lewis Jr. (21)
| Willy Hernangómez (9)
| James Johnson (6)
| Smoothie King Center3,700
| 21–27
|-style="background:#cfc;"
| 49
| April 4
| @ Houston
| 
| Lonzo Ball (27)
| Willy Hernangómez (12)
| Lonzo Ball (9)
| Toyota Center3,268
| 22–27
|-style="background:#fcc;"
| 50
| April 6
| @ Atlanta
| 
| Zion Williamson (34)
| Ball, Marshall (9)
| Lonzo Ball (11)
| State Farm Arena2,816
| 22–28
|-style="background:#fcc;"
| 51
| April 7
| @ Brooklyn
| 
| Eric Bledsoe (26)
| Willy Hernangómez (7)
| Johnson, Williamson (6)
| Barclays Center1,773
| 22–29
|-style="background:#cfc;"
| 52
| April 9
| Philadelphia
| 
| Zion Williamson (37)
| Zion Williamson (15)
| Zion Williamson (8)
| Smoothie King Center3,700
| 23–29
|-style="background:#cfc;"
| 53
| April 11
| @ Cleveland
| 
| Zion Williamson (38)
| Zion Williamson (9)
| Brandon Ingram (8)
| Rocket Mortgage FieldHouse4,148
| 24–29
|-style="background:#cfc;"
| 54
| April 12
| Sacramento
| 
| Brandon Ingram (34)
| Steven Adams (16)
| Brandon Ingram (7)
| Smoothie King Center3,700
| 25–29
|-style="background:#fcc;"
| 55
| April 14
| New York
| 
| Brandon Ingram (28)
| Steven Adams (10)
| Ingram, Williamson (7)
| Smoothie King Center3,700
| 25–30
|-style="background:#fcc;"
| 56
| April 16
| @ Washington
| 
| Brandon Ingram (34)
| Steven Adams (12)
| Naji Marshall (6)
| Capital One Arena0
| 25–31
|-style="background:#fcc;"
| 57
| April 18
| @ New York
| 
| Zion Williamson (34)
| Steven Adams (14)
| Zion Williamson (5)
| Madison Square Garden1,981
| 25–32
|-style="background:#fcc;"
| 58
| April 20
| Brooklyn
| 
| Zion Williamson (33)
| Zion Williamson (7)
| Naji Marshall (7)
| Smoothie King Center3,700
| 25–33
|-style="background:#cfc;"
| 59
| April 22
| @ Orlando
| 
| Brandon Ingram (29)
| Willy Hernangómez (12)
| Lonzo Ball (12)
| Amway Center3,411
| 26–33
|-style="background:#fcc;"
| 60
| April 24
| San Antonio
| 
| Zion Williamson (33)
| Zion Williamson (14)
| Brandon Ingram (6)
| Smoothie King Center3,700
| 26–34
|-style="background:#cfc;"
| 61
| April 26
| L. A. Clippers
| 
| Zion Williamson (23)
| Willy Hernangómez (10)
| Lonzo Ball (7)
| Smoothie King Center3,700
| 27–34
|-style="background:#fcc;"
| 62
| April 28
| @ Denver
| 
| Brandon Ingram (27)
| Lonzo Ball (12)
| Lonzo Ball (12)
| Ball Arena4,022
| 27–35
|-style="background:#cfc;"
| 63
| April 29
| @ Oklahoma City
| 
| Zion Williamson (27)
| Ball, Hernangómez (10)
| Ball, Williamson (6)
| Chesapeake Energy Arena0
| 28–35

|-style="background:#cfc;"
| 64
| May 1
| @ Minnesota
| 
| Zion Williamson (37)
| Lonzo Ball (11)
| Ball, Williamson (8)
| Target Center1,638
| 29–35
|-style="background:#fcc;"
| 65
| May 3
| Golden State
| 
| Zion Williamson (32)
| Zion Williamson (8)
| Lonzo Ball (8)
| Smoothie King Center3,700
| 29–36
|-style="background:#cfc;"
| 66
| May 5
| Golden State
| 
| Lonzo Ball (33)
| Zion Williamson (12)
| Zion Williamson (7)
| Smoothie King Center3,700
| 30–36
|-style="background:#fcc;"
| 67
| May 7
| @ Philadelphia
| 
| Jaxson Hayes (19)
| Willy Hernangómez (9)
| Hernangómez, Marshall (5)
| Wells Fargo Center5,119
| 30–37
|-style="background:#cfc;"
| 68
| May 9
| @ Charlotte
| 
| Eric Bledsoe (24)
| Willy Hernangómez (16)
| Eric Bledsoe (11)
| Spectrum Center4,196
| 31–37
|-style="background:#fcc;"
| 69
| May 10
| @ Memphis
| 
| Nickeil Alexander-Walker (18)
| Naji Marshall (11)
| Nickeil Alexander-Walker (6)
| FedExForum2,507
| 31–38
|-style="background:#fcc;"
| 70
| May 12
| @ Dallas
| 
| Bledsoe, Hayes (15)
| Willy Hernangómez (10)
| Eric Bledsoe (4)
| American Airlines Center4,373
| 31–39
|-style="background:#fcc;"
| 71
| May 14
| @ Golden State
| 
| Nickeil Alexander-Walker (30)
| Naji Marshall (13)
| Alexander-Walker, Bledsoe (4)
| Chase Center4,155
| 31–40
|-style="background:#fcc;"
| 72
| May 16 
| L. A. Lakers
| 
| Willy Hernangómez (19)
| Willy Hernangómez (13)
| Naji Marshall (7)
| Smoothie King Center3,700
| 31–41

Transactions

Trades

Free agency

Re-signed

Additions

Subtractions
-->

References

New Orleans Pelicans
New Orleans Pelicans seasons
New Orleans Pelicans
New Orleans Pelicans